Garko may refer to:

 Gabriel Garko, an Italian actor and former fashion model
 Gianni Garko, an Italian actor
 Ryan Garko, a first baseman for the Texas Rangers of Major League Baseball
 Garko, Nigeria, a Local Government Area in Kano State